The 2002 South Australian Soccer Federation season was the 96th season of soccer in South Australia.

2002 SASF Premier League

The 2002 South Australian Premier League season was the top level domestic association football competition in South Australia for 2002. It was contested by 12 teams in a single 22 round league format, each team playing all of their opponents twice.

Finals

2002 SASF State League

The 2002 South Australian State League season was the second highest domestic level association football competition in South Australia. It was contested by 12 teams in a single 22 round league format, each team playing all of their opponents twice.

Finals

See also
2002 SASF Premier League
2002 SASF State League
National Premier Leagues South Australia
Football Federation South Australia

References

2003 in Australian soccer
Football South Australia seasons